One hundred and twelve Guggenheim Fellowships were awarded in 1948. Twenty-five of the artists and scholars were from California, the most from any state.

1948 U.S. and Canadian Fellows

1948 Latin American and Caribbean Fellows

See also
 Guggenheim Fellowship
 List of Guggenheim Fellowships awarded in 1947
 List of Guggenheim Fellowships awarded in 1949

References

1948
1948 awards